Maple Ridge Township is a township in Beltrami County, Minnesota, United States. The population was 108 as of the 2000 census.

Maple Ridge Township was named for the sugar maple trees growing within its borders.

Geography
According to the United States Census Bureau, the township has a total area of 36.5 square miles (94.5 km2), of which 34.2 square miles (88.5 km2) is land and 2.3 square miles (6.0 km2) (6.31%) is water.

Major highways
  Minnesota State Highway 89

Lakes
 Bog Lake
 Boston Lake
 Brass Lake
 Fahul Lake (southwest three-quarters)
 Fawn Lake
 Green Lake
 Grenn Lake
 Little Puposky Lake (vast majority)
 Muskrat Lake (north three-quarters)
 Puposky Lake (west quarter)
 Rice Lake (south quarter)
 Stray Horse Lake

Adjacent townships
 Durand Township (east)
 Nebish Township (east)
 Liberty Township (south)
 Buzzle Township (southwest)
 Roosevelt Township (west)
 Alaska Township (northwest)

Demographics
As of the census of 2000, there were 108 people, 42 households, and 33 families residing in the township. The population density was 3.2 people per square mile (1.2/km2). There were 50 housing units at an average density of 1.5/sq mi (0.6/km2). The racial makeup of the township was 88.89% White, 9.26% Native American, 1.85% from other races. Hispanic or Latino of any race were 1.85% of the population.

There were 42 households, out of which 38.1% had children under the age of 18 living with them, 57.1% were married couples living together, 11.9% had a female householder with no husband present, and 21.4% were non-families. 19.0% of all households were made up of individuals, and 7.1% had someone living alone who was 65 years of age or older. The average household size was 2.57 and the average family size was 2.91.

In the township the population was spread out, with 26.9% under the age of 18, 6.5% from 18 to 24, 31.5% from 25 to 44, 18.5% from 45 to 64, and 16.7% who were 65 years of age or older. The median age was 36 years. For every 100 females, there were 116.0 males. For every 100 females age 18 and over, there were 125.7 males.

The median income for a household in the township was $30,625, and the median income for a family was $33,125. Males had a median income of $20,625 versus $18,750 for females. The per capita income for the township was $13,615. There were 6.5% of families and 13.5% of the population living below the poverty line, including 11.1% of under eighteens and 16.0% of those over 64.

References
 United States National Atlas
 United States Census Bureau 2007 TIGER/Line Shapefiles
 United States Board on Geographic Names (GNIS)

Townships in Beltrami County, Minnesota
Townships in Minnesota